Bunchosia linearifolia is a species of plant in the Malpighiaceae family. It is endemic to Cuba.

References

Endemic flora of Cuba
linearifolia
Vulnerable plants
Taxonomy articles created by Polbot
Taxa named by Percy Wilson